A bifurcation lake is a lake that has outflows into two different drainage basins and thus the drainage divide cannot be defined exactly because it is situated in the middle of the lake.

Examples

Vesijako (the name Vesijako actually means "drainage divide") and Lummene in the Finnish Lakeland are two nearby lakes in Finland. Both drain in two directions: into the Kymijoki basin that drains into the Gulf of Finland and into the Kokemäenjoki basin that drains into the Gulf of Bothnia. 

Similarly the lakes Isojärvi and Inhottu in the Karvianjoki basin in the Satakunta region of western Finland both have two outlets: from Inhottu the waters flow into the Gulf of Bothnia through the Eteläjoki River in Pori and into lake Isojärvi through the Pomarkunjoki River. From lake Isojärvi the waters flow to the Gulf of Bothnia through the Pohjajoki river in Pori and through the Merikarvianjoki river in Merikarvia. In the Karvianjoki basin there have formerly been two other bifurcations, which no longer exist due to human action.

Another example is Bontecou Lake, a shallow, man-made bifurcation lake in Dutchess County, New York.

Lake Diefenbaker in Saskatchewan is a reservoir created by damming South Saskatchewan River and Qu'Appelle River.  The lake continues to drain into the two rivers, but the Qu'Appelle receives a much enlarged flow (in essence, a diversion of flow from the South Saskatchewan) due to the damming. Both rivers eventually drain into Hudson Bay via Lake Winnipeg and the Nelson River. Also located in Saskatchewan is Wollaston Lake, which is the source of Fond du Lac River draining into the Arctic Ocean and of Cochrane River draining into Hudson Bay and the Atlantic Ocean.

Isa Lake in Yellowstone National Park is a natural bifurcated lake which drains into two oceans.  Its eastern drainage is to the Gulf of Mexico (part of the Atlantic Ocean) via the Firehole River, while its western drainage is to the Pacific Ocean via the Lewis River.

Peeler Lake in California's Hoover Wilderness is a natural bifurcated lake that lies along the Great Basin Divide. It has two outlets, one of which drains east into the Great Basin, and one of which drains west to the Pacific Ocean.

Lake Okeechobee in Florida is a particularly rare example of a trifurcation lake. Via the artificial Okeechobee Waterway, it flows east to the Atlantic Ocean through the St. Lucie River and west to the Gulf of Mexico through the Caloosahatchee River. Meanwhile, part of the lake's water naturally flows south through the Everglades into the Florida Bay. As a result of this artificial trifurcation, the Eastern Continental Divide of North America terminates at the lake rather than further south near Miami.

Heavenly Lake on the North Korea–People's Republic of China border.

Lake Pedder in Tasmania, as a result of damming, drains east as the Huon river and west as the Serpentine, a tributary of the Gordon.

See also

 River bifurcation
 List of unusual drainage systems

References

 Not Any Usual Route (About bifurcation lakes in Finland)
 Kuusisto, Esko (1984). Suomen vesistöjen bifurkaatiot. (Abstract: The bifurcations of Finnish watercourses) Terra 96:4, 253–261. Helsinki: Geographical Society of Finland.

External links

Hydrology
Geomorphology
 
Lakes by type